Jodi Taylor is an English author of fantasy-style historical fiction, historical romance and romance novels.

Biography
 
Taylor was born in Bristol. She attended raves. 
 
With her then-husband, Taylor moved to Yorkshire. She worked for North Yorkshire County Council for almost 20 years, in positions including library facilities manager.
 
Her first book, Just One Damned Thing After Another, was self-published on two download websites. That manuscript was subsequently purchased by Accent Press, which published all her subsequent works through December 2018. Headline Publishing Group became responsible for publishing her works as of January 2019.
 
Taylor lives in Gloucestershire.

Reception
 
Just One Damned Thing After Another appeared on the USA Today Best-Selling Books list on 21 January 2016 at #74. It earned a starred review from Publishers Weekly, which called it "a carnival ride" in a "world ... depicted in lush detail". The review in Library Journal lauded the book's "appealing cast of characters", with "plenty of humor, lots of action, and even a touch of romance".

Bibliography

The Chronicles of St Mary's 
 
Taylor's flagship series follows the staff of St Mary's Institute of Historical Research, especially historian Dr Madeleine "Max" Maxwell, as they time-travel to "investigate major historical events in contemporary time".
 
Novels
 
 Just One Damned Thing After Another (June 2013)
 A Symphony of Echoes (October 2013)
 A Second Chance (February 2014)
 A Trail Through Time (July 2014)
 No Time Like the Past (February 2015)
 What Could Possibly Go Wrong? (August 2015)
 Lies, Damned Lies, and History (May 2016)
 And the Rest is History (April 2017)
 An Argumentation of Historians (May 2018)
 Hope For the Best (May 2019)
 Plan For The Worst (April 2020)
 Another Time, Another Place (April 2021)
 A Catalogue of Catastrophe (April 2022)
 The Good, The Bad and The History (June 2023)
 
Short stories
 
 When a Child is Born (November 2013)
 Roman Holiday (June 2014)
 Christmas Present (November 2014)
 The Very First Damned Thing (October 2015)
 Ships and Stings and Wedding Rings (November 2015)
 The Great St Mary's Day Out (August 2016)
 My Name is Markham (December 2016)
 A Perfect Storm (August 2017)
 Christmas Past (25 December 2017)
 The Battersea Barricades (23 April 2018)
 The Steam Pump Jump (12 July 2018)
 And Now For Something Completely Different (25 December 2018)
 When Did You Last See Your Father? (5 September 2019)
 Why is Nothing Ever Simple? (25 December 2019)
 The Ordeal of the Haunted Room (25 December 2020)
 
Collections
 The Chronicles of St Mary's Boxset, Volume 1 (February 2015) – novels 1-3
 The Long and Short of It (June 2017) - A collection of short stories (The Very First Damned Thing; When a Child is Born; Roman Holiday; Christmas Present; Ships and Stings and Wedding Rings; The Great St Mary's Day Out; My Name is Markham; A Perfect Storm)
 Long Story Short (July 2019) – The second collection of short stories (Christmas Past; The Battersea Barricades; The Steam-Pump Jump; And Now For Something Completely Different; When Did You Last See Your Father?; Desiccated Water; Markham and the Anal Probing; Little Donkey)

The Time Police 
Novels
 Doing Time (October 2019)
 Hard Time (October 2020)
 Saving Time (October 2021)
 About Time (October 2022)

Short Stories
 Santa Grint (December 2022)

Frogmorton Farm 
 
Novels
 
 The Nothing Girl (May 2014)
 The Something Girl (July 2017)
 
Short stories
 
 Little Donkey (February 2015)
 Joy to the World (November 2020)

Elizabeth Cage 
 
 White Silence (September 2017)
 Dark Light (September 2018)
 Long Shadows (August 2021)

Writing as Isabella Barclay
 A Bachelor Establishment (July 2015)

References

External links

 

Year of birth missing (living people)
Living people
21st-century English novelists
21st-century English women writers
Women science fiction and fantasy writers
English women novelists
Writers from Bristol